Katrin Müller (born ) is a Swiss freestyle skier, specializing in ski cross.

Müller competed at the 2010 Winter Olympics for Switzerland. She placed 9th in the qualifying round in ski cross, to advance to the knockout stages. She failed to finish her first round heat, and did not advance.

As of April 2013, her best finish at the World Championships is 14th, in 2011.

Müller made her World Cup debut in January 2008. As of April 2013, she has one World Cup victory, coming at Bischofswiesen in 2011/12. Her best World Cup overall finish in ski cross is 3rd, in 2011/12.

World Cup Podiums

References

1989 births
Living people
Olympic freestyle skiers of Switzerland
Freestyle skiers at the 2010 Winter Olympics
Freestyle skiers at the 2014 Winter Olympics
People from Dielsdorf District
Swiss female freestyle skiers
Sportspeople from the canton of Zürich
21st-century Swiss women